Derrick Bishop (born 17 December 1983) is a Barbadian cricketer. He played in three List A matches for the University of the West Indies cricket team, and two Twenty20 matches for the Barbados cricket team in 2007/08.

See also
 List of Barbadian representative cricketers

References

External links
 

1983 births
Living people
Barbadian cricketers
Barbados cricketers
University of the West Indies cricketers
People from Saint Philip, Barbados